Erebus Motorsport (formerly known as Erebus Racing) is an Australian motor racing team. The team competes in the Supercars Championship with two Holden ZB Commodores. The team's current drivers are Will Brown and Brodie Kostecki.

The team is owned by Betty Klimenko and is based in Melbourne. The team launched as a GT racing team in 2011 with the team joining Supercars in 2013 following the purchase of Stone Brothers Racing. The team is best known for winning the 2017 Bathurst 1000 with David Reynolds and Luke Youlden, and also won the 2013 Bathurst 12 Hour.

Racing history

GT

The team, then known as Erebus Racing, formed in 2011 when the team's first Mercedes SLS AMG GT3 car arrived from Europe. In the 2011 Australian GT Championship season, early season problems, coupled with the car not being ready until Round 3, limited driver Peter Hackett's championship run and he finished fourth. He did claim race wins at Phillip Island and at Mount Panorama along the way. Early 2012 provided the teams highlight to date, with second place in the 2012 Armor All Bathurst 12 Hour with V8 Supercar driver Tim Slade and European GT racers Jeroen Bleekemolen and Bret Curtis co-driving with Hackett.

The team expanded to a second car for the 2012 Australian GT Championship season with former V8 Utes and Nations Cup GT racer James Brock (the son of the late nine-time Bathurst 1000 winner Peter Brock) added as the second driver. After a crash in the opening round at the Clipsal 500 which put Hackett behind, he quickly got himself into the lead of the Championship. He led from round four through to the final round at Homebush, where he crashed in the opening race. He would go on to finish the championship in second place behind Klark Quinn.

Brock started the season strongly with a podium in Adelaide. A heavy crash at Phillip Island slid him down the order. After re-building the #62 from scratch, he suffered another crash at Sydney Motorsport Park, resulting in another write-off. For the remaining three events of the season, Brock was replaced by a group of European-based AMG Customer Sports factory drivers. Maro Engel. was the first, winning the round at Phillip Island, before FIA GT1 World Team Champion, Thomas Jäger joined the team. At the final round in Homebush, five times DTM Champion, Bernd Schneider joined the team and comprehensively dominated the weekend.

In February 2013, the team entered the Liqui-Moly Bathurst 12 Hour with its two Mercedes SLS AMG GT3s. #36 was piloted by Bernd Schneider, Thomas Jäger and Alex Roloff, while car #63 was piloted by regular driver Peter Hackett and V8 Supercars drivers Lee Holdsworth and Tim Slade. It was car #63 that would take pole position on the Saturday, with Lee Holdsworth behind the wheel, with a 2.06.22, but could only finish the race in 6th position, five laps behind the race winners after an incident late in the race whilst leading. This left the #36 machine to take the team's first Bathurst 12 Hour victory and added this race to the Dubai 24 Hour victory for Schneider and the AMG Customer Sports program. They ended the dramatic race with a lead well over a lap on the second and third placed cars. Roloff had the honour to take the chequered flag surviving the mixed conditions without radio contact to the team. The team struggled in that year's Australian GT season, with Jack Le Brocq only managing ninth in the points.

In 2014, the team finished third in the Bathurst 12 Hour, with Greg Crick, Will Davison and Jack Le Brocq behind the wheel. Their other entry, driven by Maro Engel, set pole position and in doing so won the first Allan Simonsen Pole Position Trophy. In the 2014 Australian GT Championship, Erebus won the title with Richard Muscat driving.

In the 2015 Liqui Moly Bathurst 12 Hour, the team's leading entry was the Dean Canto, Le Brocq and Muscat SLS AMG, which finished in fifth position. In the 2016 Liqui Moly Bathurst 12 Hour, the team's leading entry was the Thomas Jäger, Nico Bastian and V8 Supercar driver David Reynolds SLS AMG, which finished in fifth position, A second SLS AMG was entered for Bernd Schneider, Maro Engel and Austin Cindric, however the car did not finish after Cindric hit the wall at the end of Mountain Straight.

After a period of scaling back of GT activities, the team prepared an entry at the 2019 Bathurst 12 Hour which included their Bathurst 1000 winning combination of David Reynolds and Luke Youlden alongside Yasser Shahin.

Supercars Championship

In September 2012, Erebus Motorsport announced it was in the process of purchasing Stone Brothers Racing and would enter the 2013 International V8 Supercars Championship, competing with three Mercedes-Benz E63 W212s entered under the category's new "Car of the Future" regulations. The sale was finalised in January 2013, with the team purchasing one Racing Entitlement Contract (REC) and leasing a second from the Stone Brothers, whilst operating a third car on behalf of satellite team James Rosenberg Racing. With Shane van Gisbergen leaving the team at the end of the 2012 season, Erebus recruited former DTM driver Maro Engel as his replacement, whilst retaining Lee Holdsworth and Tim Slade in the other two cars.

For 2014, the team scaled back to a two-car operation with the James Rosenberg Racing REC and Tim Slade both moving to Walkinshaw Racing. Will Davison replaced Maro Engel. Lee Holdsworth scored the team's first race win at Winton in April 2014.

In 2015, Ashley Walsh replaced Lee Holdsworth as the driver for Car #4. Will Davison secured the team's second V8 Supercar race win at the 2015 Ubet Perth Super Sprint at Barbagallo Raceway.

The team operated from the team from the former Stone Brothers Racing premises in Yatala on the Gold Coast until the end of the 2015 season, when it moved its V8 Supercars and GT operations under one roof in Moorabbin, Melbourne. This was replaced by a new facility in Dandenong in mid-2016 after its previous facility became too small.

David Reynolds replaced Will Davison for the 2016 Championship, with Davison moving to Tekno Autosports. Reynolds was joined by Aaren Russell with the team switching from running the E63 W212s to a pair of Holden Commodore VFs. Russell split with the team after the Townsville 400 round, and was replaced by Craig Baird for Ipswich. Shae Davies raced the teams #4 Entry for the remainder of the 2016 Season.

For 2017, Reynolds remained with the team, while Dale Wood replaced Davies as the driver of the newly renumbered #99 Entry. Reynolds, partnered with Luke Youlden, won the rain-affected 2017 Supercheap Auto Bathurst 1000, while the second car of Wood - partnered by Chris Pither - finished a season-best 4th. In October 2017, Wood announced that he would no longer be continuing his full-time drive with the team into 2018. His replacement will be 2017 Dunlop Super2 Series competitor, Anton de Pasquale. In 2018, Reynolds won three races and finished fifth in the championship with de Pasquale 20th in his debut year.

In 2019, Penrite, a sponsor of the team since 2015, increased its sponsorship to both cars and took over title sponsorship of the team. Reynolds finished sixth in the championship and de Pasquale 14th.

In 2021, Will Brown and Brodie Kostecki replaced Reynolds and De Pasquale. Also Boost Mobile partnered with Erebus Motorsport for naming rights branding on the #99 Car of Kostecki for a full season in the Championship. This led to a full naming rights sponsorship in 2022, where Boost Mobile became naming rights sponsor of the entire team including Will Brown's #9 car. The team was known as Boost Mobile Racing by Erebus. A Wild Card entry to Bathurst was also announced for 2021, dragging out Greg Murphy from retirement, With Richie Stanaway to partner him. Greg Murphy is a long time friend of Boost Mobile founder Peter Adderton. This did not go ahead in 2021 due to Covid-19 restrictions but went ahead in 2022, Stanaway and Murphy finished 11th, after starting 4th.

For 2023, Coca-Cola will take over naming rights sponsorship, with the team to be known as Coca-Cola Racing by Erebus. Will Brown and Brodie Kostecki will remain with the team. The team will also swap to running the Chevrolet Camaro as the championship moves to the Gen 3 Regulations.

Other
Guy Stewart formerly drove the team's Aurion-Yamaha in the Aussie Racing Cars series, and the team was also involved in a V8 Utes team with Adam Marjoram driving. The team formerly ran a Mygale F3 car labelled Erebus Academy, racing in Australian Formula 3 with Jack Le Brocq driving. Members of the Erebus Academy development program have included Le Brocq, Adam Marjoram and Richard Muscat.

Supercars Championship drivers
The following is a list of drivers who have driven for the team in the Supercars Championship, in order of their first appearance. Drivers who only drove for the team on a part-time basis are listed in italics.

 Lee Holdsworth (2013–14)
 Tim Slade (2013)
 Maro Engel (2013)
 Craig Baird (2013–14, 2016)
 Andrew Thompson (2013)
 Steven Johnson (2013)
 David Brabham (2013)
 Will Davison (2014–15)
 Alex Davison (2014–15)
 Ashley Walsh (2015)
 Jack Le Brocq (2015)
 Dean Canto (2015)
 Aaren Russell (2016)
 David Reynolds (2016–20)
 Shae Davies (2016)
 Chris van der Drift (2016)
 Dale Wood (2017)
 Chris Pither (2017)
 Luke Youlden (2017–19)
 Anton de Pasquale (2018–20)
 Will Brown (2018–present)
 Brodie Kostecki (2020–present)
 Jack Perkins (2021)
 David Russell (2021)
 Greg Murphy (2022)
 Richie Stanaway (2022)

Racing results

Car No. 9 results

Car No. 99 results

Bathurst 1000 Results

See also
 Stone Brothers Racing
 Mercedes-Benz in motorsport

References

External links
 
Official website – V8 Supercars
Peter Hackett at Australian GT Championship
James Brock at Australian GT Championship

Australian auto racing teams
Sports teams in Victoria (Australia)
Supercars Championship teams
2011 establishments in Australia
Australian Formula 3 teams
Mercedes-Benz in motorsport
Auto racing teams established in 2011
Organisations based in Melbourne